Complementary Therapies in Medicine is a bimonthly peer-reviewed medical journal covering complementary and alternative medicine. It was established in 1986 as Complementary Medical Research, obtaining its current name in 1993. Although it was originally published three times per year by Routledge, it is now published bimonthly by Elsevier. The editor-in-chief is Kathi Kemper (Ohio State University Medical Center). According to the Journal Citation Reports, the journal has a 2018 impact factor of 1.979.

References

External links 
 

Alternative and traditional medicine journals
Elsevier academic journals
Publications established in 1986
Bimonthly journals
English-language journals